Sinnbus is an independent record label and music publisher headquartered in Berlin, Germany, founded in 2003. The style of music released by Sinnbus varies from post-rock and post-punk to indie and electronica.

It first started as a loose network of friends, musicians and artists releasing albums and booking gigs independently.
They started with a sampler of local bands. The first release was the first album of SDNMT 2003.

In 2013 Sinnbus celebrated its 10th anniversary and has released its 50th full album.

Artists 

 Audrey
 Barra Head
 Bodi Bill
 Einar Stray Orchestra
 Me and My Drummer
 Rue Royale
 The/Das
 Troy von Balthazar
 We Are the City

References

External links 
Official Homepage
Sinnbus at Soundcloud
Sinnbus at Discogs
Sinnbus at Vimeo
 LABEL LOVE: A Sinnbus story... Artrocker
 One decade of DIY – Sinnbus records celebrates its 10th birthday 

German record labels
Record labels established in 2003
German independent record labels
Electronic music record labels